A Monte Cristo sandwich is an egg-dipped or batter-dipped ham and cheese sandwich that is pan or deep fried. It is a variation of the French croque monsieur.

From the 1930s to the 1960s, American cookbooks had recipes for this sandwich under such names as "French sandwich", "toasted ham sandwich", and "French toasted cheese sandwich". The Monte Cristo sandwich supposedly entered the scene in the 1960s in Southern California, and exploded in popularity after the Blue Bayou Restaurant in Disneyland began serving it.

Description
In most regions, the sandwich is savory rather than sweet. Traditionally, it is dipped in its entirety in beaten egg and pan-fried, though it may also be deep-fried. Regional variations may include sliced turkey. In some areas of the contiguous U.S. it is served grilled; in others, it is an open sandwich with only the bread egg-dipped and the assembled sandwich heated slightly under a grill or broiler. Some restaurants serve a variation that is batter-dipped and deep-fried. The Monte Cristo is sometimes covered in powdered sugar and served with maple syrup or preserves.

See also

 Cheese dream
 Croque monsieur
 Cuisine of New York City
 French toast
 Grilled cheese
 List of sandwiches
 Reuben sandwich
 Welsh rabbit
French fry

References

External links
 Count the Monte Cristos at The Stranger

American sandwiches
Cheese sandwiches
Pork sandwiches
Deep fried foods